The 1949 Wake Forest Demon Deacons football team was an American football team that represented Wake Forest University during the 1949 college football season. In its 13th season under head coach Peahead Walker, the team compiled a 4–6 record and finished in a three-way tie for ninth place in the Southern Conference.

Back Bill Gregus and guard Ray Cicia were selected by the Associated Press as first-team players on the 1949 All-Southern Conference football team.

Schedule

Team leaders

References

Wake Forest
Wake Forest Demon Deacons football seasons
Wake Forest Demon Deacons football